Ezequiel Melillo may refer to:

 Ezequiel Melillo (footballer, born 1990), Argentine midfielder
 Ezequiel Melillo (footballer, born 1993), Argentine midfielder